The Monito gecko (Sphaerodactylus micropithecus) is a lizard, a species of gecko endemic to the island of Monito, in the archipelago of Puerto Rico.

Habitat & distribution
It was discovered in May 1974 when a single adult and an egg were collected from the island of Monito.

Conservation
It is believed that its scarcity may be due to the introduction of rats to Monito and from habitat destruction caused by United States Navy bombing practices after World War II.  In 1982, a survey was conducted to establish the population range and size of the species. A total of 18 individuals were observed. For these reasons the species was placed in the endangered species list on October 15, 1982 by the United States Fish and Wildlife Service. Black (ship) rats were eradicated from the island by the Puerto Rico Department of Natural Environmental and Resources in 1992 and 1999. The geckos have thrived since the removal of rats, and were proposed in 2018 to be delisted from the Endangered Species list.

Taxonomy
Subsequent studies proved that the Monito gecko is more closely related to S. macrolepis, a species common throughout the Puerto Rican Bank.

Description
Due to the rarity of the species biological information is limited. The Monito gecko is light-gray to tan in coloration with darker spots on top of the body. The maximum length for this species is 36 mm from snout to vent. Information on the diet of the Monito gecko is currently unavailable but it is believed that, similar to other geckos, it is an insectivore and/or carnivore. Reproductive information is also limited but it is estimated that breeding season lasts from March to November. It is believed that females lay one or two eggs that hatch in 2 to 3 months.  Contrary to the majority of geckos, it is diurnal.

See also

List of amphibians and reptiles of Puerto Rico
Fauna of Puerto Rico
List of endemic fauna of Puerto Rico

References

  Listed as Endangered (EN D v2.3)
 

Sphaerodactylus
Reptiles of Puerto Rico
Endemic fauna of Puerto Rico
Reptiles described in 1977
ESA endangered species